Wang Zhihuan (688–742), alternatively transliterated as Wang Tsu-huan, was a Chinese poet of the Kaiyuan era of Emperor Xuanzong of Tang. He is best known for his jueju "Climbing Stork Tower".

Poetry
No collection of Wang's poems seems to have been made. Only six of his poems survive, all of which are quatrains, but almost every one has become a minor classic.

Two poems were included in the famous poetry anthology Three Hundred Tang Poems, translated by Witter Bynner as "At Heron Lodge" (also called "On the Stork Tower", a five-character-quatrain) and "Beyond the Border", a folk-song-styled-verse.

Famous competition at the wine shop
Wang Zhihuan was once involved in a famous incident at a wine shop with fellow poets Gao Shi and Wang Changling, in which they agreed to compete as to which of their poems would be most sung by the professional entertainers who happened to show up in the course of that evening's entertainment. Towards the beginning of the evening, one performer happened to sing one of Wang Changling's poems. Not too long after that, another performer sang one of Gao Shi's poems. And, then another performer recited another lyric of Wang Changling's. The performance then went on, with one for Gao Shi, two for Wang Changling, and none for Wang Zhihuan. It so happened that one of the female entertainers known as the most beautiful finally gave her performance: she delivered a piece, based on a poem of Wang Zhihuan's (this was the one, which, much later, Witter Bynner translated as "Beyond the Border").

See also

Tang poetry
Three Hundred Tang Poems

Notes

References
 Owen, Stephen. The Great Age of Chinese Poetry: The High Tang. Revised Edition. Melbourne: Quirin Press, 2013. 
Wu, John C. H. (1972). The Four Seasons of Tang Poetry. Rutland, Vermont: Charles E.Tuttle.

Further reading  
 Bu Dong 卜冬. Wang Zhihuan de liangzhou ci 王之渙的涼州詞. Wenxue yanjiu 1958.2. 
 Varsano, Paula. "Enduring Pleasures". In Proceedings of the American Philosophical Society, Vol. 151, No. 2 (June 2007), pp. 211-217.

External links
 
 

Three Hundred Tang Poems poets
688 births
742 deaths
People from Taiyuan
Poets from Shanxi
8th-century Chinese poets